Gyliotrachela australis is a species of small air-breathing land snail, a terrestrial pulmonate gastropod mollusk in the family Pupillidae.

This species is endemic to Australia.

References

Pupillidae
Gastropods described in 1917
Taxonomy articles created by Polbot
Taxobox binomials not recognized by IUCN